The sport of boxing has been practised in Canada since before Canadian Confederation in 1867. Boxing was illegal in Canada during the bare-knuckle era but fights took place in remote areas and the last of them was in Halifax, Nova Scotia in 1901.

Tommy Burns from Normanby Township near Hanover, was the first Canadian to win the world heavyweight title, becoming the champion in 1906 and defending the title thirteen times until he was defeated via Referee's decision by Jack Johnson on Boxing Day December 26, 1908 at Rushcutters Bay, Sydney NSW Australia. On May 10, 2014, Bermane Stiverne won the vacant WBC World Heavyweight Championship after a sixth-round knockout of Chris Arreola.

Governing bodies
There is currently a debate in Canadian boxing circles regarding the oldest active professional championship sanctioning body. The National Championship of Canada (NCC) claims to be the legitimate continuation of the Canadian Boxing Federation (CBF) title, which was dissolved to avoid any conflict with the organization's goals regarding safety and regulation. The CBF title dates back to 1925. The Canadian Professional Boxing Council (CPBC) also claims to be the oldest active sanctioning body in Canada, tracing its history back to 1976. The CPBC rejects the NCC's claim to the CBF's history. As of 2016, the CPBC is the more active of the two bodies, while a certain degree of prestige continues to surround the NCC title thanks to champions like Brandon Cook, Sylvera Louis, and Dillon Carman.

Boxing Canada is the national governing body for the sport of boxing in Canada recognized by the Canadian Olympic Committee.

 National Championship of Canada (formerly the Canadian Boxing Federation) 
 NABA Canada - a title offered by the North American Boxing Association
 Canadian Professional Boxing Council (CPBC)
 National Boxing Authority (NBA) - ranking and sanctioning Canadian professional boxing since 2012
 Canadian Amateur Boxing Association (CABA) - the official governing body for amateur boxing in Canada
 WBC Amateur Boxing Canada - an alternative body governing amateur boxing in Canada

Notable boxers

Venues

References